Espakeh castle is a historical castle located in Nik Shahr County in Sistan and Baluchestan Province, The longevity of this fortress dates back to the Middle Ages Historical periods after Islam.

References 

Castles in Iran